Trnava is a village located in the municipality of Preševo, Serbia. According to the 2002 census, the village has a population of 1,160 people. Of these, 1018 (87,75 %) were ethnic Albanians, 109 (9,39 %) were Serbs, 2 (0,17 %) Bosniaks, 1 (0,08 %) Hungarian, 1 (0,08 %) Macedonian, and 28 (2,41 %) others.

References

Populated places in Pčinja District
Preševo
Albanian communities in Serbia